Hatun Pastu (Quechua hatun big, pastu grass (a borrowing from Spanish pasto) also spelled Jatun Pasto) is a mountain in the Andes of Peru, about  high. It is located in the Puno Region, Lampa Province, on the border of the districts Palca and Paratía, southeast of the mountain Qillqa and north of Waykira.

An intermittent stream named Hatun Pastu originates north of the mountain. It is a tributary of the river Wila Wila (Vila Vila) whose waters flow to Lake Titicaca.

See also 
 Yanawara

References

Mountains of Peru
Mountains of Puno Region